Minister for Heritage is a position in the government of Western Australia, currently held by David Templeman of the Labor Party. The position was first created in 1990, for the government of Carmen Lawrence, and has existed in every government since then. The minister is responsible for the State Heritage Office, and also for the Heritage Council of Western Australia.

Titles
 19 February 1990 – present: Minister for Heritage

List of ministers

See also
 Minister for Culture and the Arts (Western Australia)
 Minister for Planning (Western Australia)

References
 David Black (2014), The Western Australian Parliamentary Handbook (Twenty-Third Edition). Perth [W.A.]: Parliament of Western Australia.

Heritage
Minister for Heritage